Markar Melkonian is an Armenian-American writer, lecturer, and solidarity worker.

Melkonian's book My Brother's Road: An American's Fateful Journey to Armenia, details the life of his brother, Monte Melkonian, and his role in the struggle for Armenian independence in the 1990s. My Brother's Road was published by I.B. Tauris in 2005 (revised paperback 2008). Translations in Italian, Armenian, Russian, and French are forthcoming. He recently wrote the book 'The Wrong Train: Notes on Armenia since the Counterrevolution' which is an outstanding guide to the English language that offers crucial contextual analysis of the challenges that have been plaguing Armenia as it shifts from a post-Soviet economy to a fiercely capitalist one, which inevitably brings about its own set of difficulties.

Books
Markar Melkonian's books include

References

American writers of Armenian descent
Living people
Year of birth missing (living people)